Nepean Bay is a locality in the Australian state  of South Australia located  on the southern shore of Western Cove in Nepean Bay on the north coast of Kangaroo Island and about  south-west of the state capital of Adelaide and about  south-south-west of the municipal seat of Kingscote.

The settlement in Nepean Bay was laid out by Nepean Developments Ltd in 1961 on sections 143 and 144 in the cadastral unit of the Hundred of Haines. Its boundaries were created in May 2002 for “the long established name” which is derived from the adjoining bay.

Nepean Bay consists of land zoned for agricultural use with a settlement consisting mainly of low-rise dwellings located at its western end.

The 2016 Australian census which was conducted in August 2016 reports that Nepean Bay had a population of 131 people.

Nepean Bay is located within the federal division of Mayo, the state electoral district of Mawson and the local government area of the Kangaroo Island Council.

See also
Nepean (disambiguation)

References

Towns on Kangaroo Island